Governor Ferguson or Fergusson may refer to:

Bernard Fergusson, Baron Ballantrae (1911–1980), Governor-General of New Zealand
Sir Charles Fergusson, 7th Baronet (1865–1951), 3rd Governor-General of New Zealand
George Ferguson (Lt Governor of Tobago) (1748–1820), Lieutenant Governor of Tobago in 1781, sometimes referred to as Governor
George Fergusson (diplomat) (born 1955), Governor of the Pitcairn Islands, from 2006 to 2010 and Governor of Bermuda from 2012 to 2016
Jan Helenus Ferguson (1826–1908), Governor of the Dutch Gold Coast from 1871 to 1872
James Fergusson (British Army officer) (1787–1865), Governor of Gibraltar from 1855 to 1859
James E. Ferguson (1871–1944), 26th Governor of Texas
Sir James Fergusson, 6th Baronet (1832–1907), Governor of South Australia from 1868 to 1873, Governor of New Zealand from 1873 to 1874, and Governor of Bombay from 1880 to 1885
Miriam A. Ferguson (1875–1961), 29th and 32nd Governor of Texas
Thompson Benton Ferguson (1857–1921), 6th Governor of Oklahoma Territory